Al-Minaa Olympic Stadium is a multi-purpose stadium in Basra, Iraq which is used mostly for football matches and hosts the home matches of Al-Minaa SC, having replaced the club's old venue Al-Minaa Stadium. The stadium has a capacity of 30,000 spectators and was opened on 26 December 2022.

See also
 List of football stadiums in Iraq

References

Football venues in Iraq
Stadiums under construction
Buildings and structures in Basra